The Men's mass start competition at the 2021 World Single Distances Speed Skating Championships was held on 13 February 2021.

Results

Semi-finals
The first eight racers from each semifinal advanced to the final.

Semi-final 1
The race was started at 14:34.

Semi-final 2
The race was started at 14:50.

Final
The final was started at 17:11.

References

Men's mass start